William Clark (June 25, 1811, in Cooperstown, Otsego County, New York – May 28, 1885) was an American politician from New York.

Life
He was the son of Cyrenus Clark (born 1772) and Rachel (Tracy) Clark (born 1777). In 1836, he married Anna Maria Newkirk (1819–1854).

He engaged in the produce and forwarding business at Fort Plain. He was at times Supervisor of the Town of Minden; and a trustee and President of the Village of Fort Plain.

He was a member of the New York State Assembly (Montgomery Co., 2nd D.) in 1852; and of the New York State Senate (15th D.) in 1863.

Sources
 The New York Civil List compiled by Franklin Benjamin Hough, Stephen C. Hutchins and Edgar Albert Werner (1870; pg. 443 and 474)
 Biographical Sketches of the State Officers and the Members of the Legislature of the State of New York in 1862 and '63 by William D. Murphy (1863; pg. 53ff)
 Hyde Genealogy by Reuben H. Walworth (1863; pg. 453)
 DIED;... ANNA MARIA, wife of William Clark... in NYT on October 2, 1854
 OBITUARY NOTES; The Hon. William Clark... in NYT on May 29, 1885

1811 births
1885 deaths
New York (state) state senators
New York (state) Whigs
19th-century American politicians
New York (state) Republicans
Members of the New York State Assembly
People from Minden, New York
Town supervisors in New York (state)
People from Cooperstown, New York
People from Fort Plain, New York